The following is a list of episodes for the British sitcom Birds of a Feather, that aired on BBC One from 16 October 1989 to 24 December 1998 and when the series returned over 15 years later, on ITV for a further three seasons and various Christmas specials with the latest episode airing on 24 December 2020. A total of 129 episodes have aired to date.

Series overview

Episodes

Series 1 (1989)

Series 2 (1990)

Series 3 (1991)

Series 4 (1992)

Series 5 (1993)

Series 6 (1994)

Series 7 (1997)

Series 8 (1998)

Series 9 (1998)

Series 10 (2014)

Series 11 (2014-15) 
An eleventh series was announced in March 2014, the day of the previous series concluding. Filming took place at Pinewood Studios in October and November 2014.

Series 12 (2016)

Broadcast
The first series, of six episodes, aired from 16 October to 20 November 1989 on Mondays at 8:30pm. A Christmas special aired on 26 December 1989 at 9:00pm. The second series aired for fifteen episodes from 6 September to 13 December 1990 on Thursdays at 8:30pm, followed by a Christmas Special on Boxing Day at 8:20pm.

The twelve-episode third series aired from 31 August to 16 November 1991 on Saturdays at 8:00pm, followed by a Christmas special on Christmas Day at 8:00pm. The fourth series, of thirteen episodes, aired from 6 September to 29 November 1992 on Sundays at 8:40pm, with a Christmas Day special at 8:00pm. Series five for thirteen episodes on Sundays at 8:20pm from 5 September to 28 November 1993, with a Christmas Special on 25 December 1993 at 8:00pm.

The sixth series aired from 18 September to 18 December 1994, for twelve episodes, on Sundays at 7:30pm. A Christmas Special followed on 24 December at 8:55pm. A special flashback episode, The Chigwell Years, was broadcast on Sunday 3 March 1996. It is now regarded as part of the seventh series. After a three-year hiatus, ten-episode seventh series aired from 26 May to 28 July 1997 on Mondays at 9:30pm, with a Christmas special on 27 December 1997 at 9:25pm.

The eighth series aired from 5 January to 9 February 1998, on Mondays at 8:30pm, for six episodes. The ninth series, also of six episodes, aired from 16 November to 24 December 1998, mostly on Mondays at 8:30pm. The tenth series began on 2 January 2014 on ITV, consisting of 8 episodes, airing at 8:30pm. The first episode gave the network its highest ratings for a comedy drama in 14 years attracting 8 million.

Series 10 (the first on ITV) aired from 2 January to 6 March 2014. ITV renewed Birds of a Feather for Series 11 (the second on ITV), which aired from 26 December 2014 to 12 February 2015. A twelfth series had been commissioned (the third for ITV) which aired on 7 January to 25 February 2016.

As of 2020, there have been a total of 129 episodes. 95 are 30 minutes long and 24 are 22 minutes long. The 1990 Christmas special was 75 minutes, the 1993 Christmas special was 60 minutes long, while the 1991, 1992, 1994 and 1997 Christmas specials were 50 minutes in duration. The final BBC episode, which aired on Christmas Eve 1998, was 40 minutes long. The 2016 Christmas special on ITV was 45 minutes long and the 2017 Christmas special on ITV was also 45 minutes long. The 2020 Christmas special was 30 minutes long.

Other media
On 15 March 1991, Birds of a Feather and sketch series French and Saunders did a short crossover skit for Comic Relief in which Jennifer Saunders and Dawn French imitate Sharon and Tracey when they arrive at their house as cleaners.

On 19 December 2014, a short sketch was screened as part of ITV's Text Santa which featured Paul O'Grady as Santa Claus. It was watched by 3.86 million viewers.

Ratings

References

External links
List of Birds of a Feather episodes at BBC
List of 

BBC-related lists
Lists of British sitcom episodes
ITV-related lists